Paleontology in Washington may refer to:

 Paleontology in Washington (state)
 Paleontology in Washington, D.C.